Su Qing may refer to:
 Su Qing (writer)
 Su Qing (actress)